Dividend distribution tax is the tax imposed by the Indian Government on Indian companies according to the dividend paid to a company's investors.

At present, the dividend  distribution tax is proposed to be removed by government in financial annual statement 2020 according to the Union Budget of India.

The company has to deposit DDT within 14 days of declaration, distribution or payment of dividend whichever is the earlier. In case of non-payment within 14 days, the company shall have to pay interest at the rate of 1% of the DDT.

As per existing tax provisions, income from dividends is tax free in the hands of the investor up to Rs 10,00,000 and beyond than tax is levied @10 percent beyond Rs 10,00,000. Further the dividends from domestic companies are tax-exempt, dividend from foreign companies are taxable in hands of investor. However, this is not to say that there is no tax levied at all. On the contrary, there is a levy of 15.00% of the dividend declared as distribution tax (Under Income tax Act, 1961). This tax is paid out of the profits/reserves of the company declaring the dividend. Additional surcharge of 12% on DDT and education cess of 4% is levied.

From 2016, the investors (resident in India) earning dividends above 10 lakhs per annum will have to pay an additional tax of 10%.

The Mutual fund companies also have to pay DDT.The rates are as under:
a) On Debt oriented funds - DDT shall be 25 percent.
b) Equity-oriented funds - DDT shall be 10 percent. (Earlier this was exempt. This tax has been made applicable from Budget 2018).

However, the Finance Act, 2020 changed the method of dividend taxation. Henceforth, all dividend received on or after 1 April 2020 is taxable in the hands of the investor/shareholder. The DDT liability on companies and mutual funds stand withdrawn. Similarly, the tax of 10% on dividend receipts of resident individuals, HUF and firms in excess of Rs 10 lakh (Section 115BBDA) also stands withdrawn.

The Finance Act, 2020 also imposes a TDS on dividend distribution by companies and mutual funds on or after 1 April 2020. The normal rate of TDS is 10% on dividend income paid in excess of Rs 5,000 from a company or mutual fund. However, as a COVID-19 relief measure, the government reduced the TDS rate to 7.5% for distribution from 14 May 2020 until 31 March 2021.

References

Distribution tax
Taxation in India